National Collegiate Rugby (NCR) formerly the "National Small College Rugby Organization" is a rugby union governing body in the United States. Headquartered in Wilmington, Delaware, NCR was created in 2007 by Chip Auscavitch and Steve Cohen to support and encourage the development and organization of small college rugby in the country. 

In 2020, NSCRO re-branded as "National Collegiate Rugby" as the organization saw massive growth in competition with teams leaving their USA Rugby based leagues for the NCR. As of 2022, NCR competitions include men's and women's championships.

Championships 

The NCR runs the following national championship events for both men's and women's college rugby clubs in both 15s and 7s rugby:

Prior to 2007, the men's Small College XVs national championship (Men's Champions Cup) was known as the East Coast Division III Collegiate Rugby Championships, and Men’s Division III National Championship until 2012.

History 
The National Small College Rugby Organization has its beginnings in 2002 to organize the first-ever small college men's and women's college rugby national playoff system, the East Coast D3 Championship. In 2008 was approved by USA Rugby. In August 2012, NSCRO reclassified Division 3 as Small College Rugby, and since 2015 Penn Mutual Life Insurance Company is the main sponsor. Men's Challenge Cup was introduced in 2014 for colleges with developing clubs. In May of 2020, NSCRO was renamed as NCR or National Collegiate Rugby with the goal to serve and work with all collegiate rugby programs of all sizes.

Conferences

References

External links
 

 
Organizations established in 2007
2007 establishments in the United States